Mabopane is a residential suburb in South Africa. It is situated in the Tshwane Metropolitan Municipality, to the north of Pretoria in Gauteng.

History

Proclamation
Mabopane was proclaimed in 1959 as a black-only residential settlement by the then Transvaal administration. Before its proclamation, the area was under the administration of Transvaal government little more than grazing lands with small communities in Boekenhoutfontein (which later became Block A), Winterveld and Hebron. The initial residents of Boekenhoutfontein were victims of forced removals from Wallmansthal, Lady Selborne, Boekenhoutkloof and other farm areas around Pretoria. With the financing coming from the South African government the first blockhouses were constructed similarly to those found in Soweto, beginning with Block A which had two-roomed houses, Block B, Block C, Block D and Block E. The areas within Mabopane were planned according to the class of its citizens; for example Block D ( with many mansions which housed the politically connected) in comparison to Block E (blockhouses).

Bophuthatswana
Mabopane was incorporated into the bantustan of Bophuthatswana from 1977 to 1994. Parts of Mabopane, Blocks F, G and H became Soshanguve to house the Non-Tswana residents of Mabopane during the Bantustan rule. Many institutions and projects were undertaken under the Presidency of Lucas Mangope of Bophutatswana this included a training college - the ODI Manpower Learning Centre, ODI hospital, housing projects in areas today known as Beirut and Lebanon, ODI prison in Block U, new high schools in Dr. Moreosele High School in Block U and the new Ngaka Maseko High School was moved from Block C to Lebanon, the ODI stadium near what used to be Sun International's Morula Casino and a highway between Mabopane and Ga-Rankuwa. These are some of the public works service delivery projects Mangope instituted to improve the lives of the people of Mabopane, the quality of service delivery unsurpassed since the dawn of the new South Africa. The residents of Soshanguve who were not Tswana speaking refused to be incorporated into Bophuthatswana and fought to remain under Pretoria. They identified with the struggles of those living in Atteridgeville and Mamelodi. The railway line that ran from Mabopane train station across the township served as a dividing line between Soshanguve and Mabopane and later became a borderline between Pretoria and Bophuthatswana. The 1990s saw the beginning of the decline of Mabopane. In an effort to restructure the municipalities to be inclusive the new government also sidelined those institutions they believed symbolized Mangope's complicity with the Apartheid government, with divestment from the ODI Stadium which was now nicknamed "Stadium sa Mangope" (meaning the stadium that belongs to Lucas Mangope) denoting negative sentiment towards the structure. The schools were no longer properly maintained as calls for resources to be equally disbursed amongst the rest of the poorly resourced schools. 

In the Apartheid days Mabopane was an active base for PAC and ANC members who mobilized workers against the government and playing the South African government against the Bophuthatswana Administration. The times were tough particularly in the mid 1980s as the local authority was holding on to power. Mabopane Square used to be the gathering ground for activists and communists protesting against the government. School riots were plentiful in the 1976 student uprising. Several township administration halls were burnt and the bus depot was vandalized.

In as much as Mabopane was not highly noticed during the apartheid era, the churches in Boekenhout served a great purpose in ensuring that people had safe spaces to hold their meetings without raising suspicion to the security police.

Post-Apartheid
With democracy on its way in the early 1990s the face of Mabopane started to change. The old authorities were replaced with new leaders in what was then the Town of Mabopane. Hon. Lehobye was the first mayor along with Hon. Molema deputy mayor who was elected to administer the town. In the advent of the new millennium, Mabopane has seen new growth and repairs and maintenance of its infrastructure.

Geography
The climate is subtropical.

Demographics

The majority of residents are of the Christian faith with different nominally sects like the ZCC, Lutheran, Twelve apostles and John Wesley. Non-Christian faiths in the minority include Islam. Mabopane, like most townships in South Africa, has a wide range of income groups, the poorest earn between $100-$300, of which comes mostly from social grants. The middle-class earnings is generally between $400-$1400. There is a definite class distinction within this group. The upper class in the township is the minority, and enjoys low property value taxes and rates. Their income bracket does exceed $5000, along with large equity in assets. The upper class is arguably comparable to the middle class in any developed country.

Most residents in the township rely on public transport to commute and this is through rail (Mabopane Station), bus and taxi. The trains usually take working residents to the main industrial area's in Pretoria, whilst the taxi is preferred for local travel within Mabopane, Soshanguve, Ga-Rankuwa and Hebron. It costs about $0.70 for a trip that can span approximately 12 kilometres. Transport to the main city is through the larger taxis which carry 14-22 passengers. The taxis are available from 04:00-21:00 and will cost $2 to commute about 43 kilometres to town. Most taxis are efficient, clean and the drivers will show courtesy to their passengers. About 20% of citizens own cars.

The languages in Mabopane are of Bantu origins. An overwhelming majority of residents understand and speak Tswana.

Local government
Mabopane falls under the City of Tshwane municipality in the Gauteng province.

Some of the counselors serving the district include struggle heroes MMC S. Nkhwashu, MMC D. Lehobye, Councillor J. Letebele and Councillor J. Sindane who is the current counselor. Mabopane has good representation at Munitoria through the councillors.

The local government City of Tshwane manages the area through agencies such as Sandspruit Water Works and Eskom. It operates locally from Boekenhout. Residents enjoy tax rebates on properties, discounted electricity and water services. The local government has put in an effort into cleaning and maintaining Mabopane. The local government, however, is also slow in improving the infrastructure of Mabopane. Many roads remain untarred, manholes are open and a lack of security exists. Tshwane Metropolitan Police Department has opened up in 2012 on Lucas Mangope Street in Block UX.

Education

Higher education
There is only one community college, Tshwane South College, which was previously known as MANPOWER. It offers a medium variety of courses, mainly rudimentary and basic and technical skills subjects. There is no option to receive any degree but a national certificate accredited by Umalusi. There is a large failure rate at this campus in comparison to other colleges.

There are two Further Education Training (FET) institutions in Mabopane offering skills mainly to unemployed residents, the elderly and women.

See also

Boputhatswana
Ga-Rankuwa
Soshanguve
Atteridgeville
Pretoria

References

Townships in Gauteng
Populated places in the City of Tshwane